The 2000 Biathlon Junior World Championships was held in Hochfilzen, Austria from February 8 to February 12, 2000. There was to be a total of eight competitions: sprint, pursuit, individual, mass start, and relay races for men and women.

Medal winners

Junior Women

Junior Men

Medal table

References

External links
Official IBU website

Biathlon Junior World Championships
2000 in biathlon
2000 in Austrian sport
International sports competitions hosted by Austria
2000 in youth sport